George Day may refer to:

George Day (bishop) (c. 1501–1556), Bishop of Chichester, 1543–1551, and vice-chancellor of the University of Cambridge in 1537
George S. Day, marketing specialist in the 1970s
George Day (Australian politician) (1826–1906), member of the New South Wales Parliament
George C. Day (1871–1940), U.S. Navy rear admiral
George Day (cricketer) (1879–1953), New Zealand cricketer
Bud Day (George E. Day, 1925–2013), U.S. Air Force colonel, Medal of Honor recipient
George Fiott Day (1820–1876), Royal Navy captain, Victoria Cross recipient
George Edward Day (1815–1872), Welsh physician
George T. Day, Free Will Baptist writer, publisher, pastor and professor
George Lawrence Day, alias of John Mapes Adams (1871–1921), United States Marine and Medal of Honor recipient